Nkanyiso Moyo (born 4 June 1983 is a retired Zimbabwean football defender.

References

1976 births
Living people
Zimbabwean footballers
Zimbabwe international footballers
Highlanders F.C. players
Black Rhinos F.C. players
Association football defenders